The 2020–21 UT Martin Skyhawks men's basketball team represented the University of Tennessee at Martin during the 2020–21 NCAA Division I men's basketball season. The Skyhawks, led by interim head coach Montez Robinson, played their home games at Skyhawk Arena in Martin, Tennessee as members of the Ohio Valley Conference.

On November 15, 10 days before the scheduled start of the season, the school announced that head coach Anthony Stewart, who was entering his fifth year as head coach, had died suddenly. No cause of death was given. On November 17, the school announced that assistant coach Montez Robinson, who had been named an assistant in September, had been named interim head coach for the season.

Previous season 
The Skyhawks finished the 2019–20 season  9–20, 5–13 in OVC play to finish in a tie for 10th place. They failed to qualify for the OVC tournament.

Roster

Schedule and results

|-
!colspan=12 style=| Regular season

|-

References

UT Martin Skyhawks
UT Martin Skyhawks men's basketball seasons
UT Martin Skyhawks men's basketball
UT Martin Skyhawks men's basketball